Lorieux is a French surname. Notable people with the surname include:

Alain Lorieux (born 1956), French rugby union player
Auguste Lorieux (1796–1842), French writer

French-language surnames